Sar Kuraki-ye Deli Rich-e Olya (also Romanized as Sar Kūrakī-ye Delī Rīch-e ‘Olyā; also known as Sar Kūhakī and Sar Kūrakī) is a village in Margown Rural District, Margown District, Boyer-Ahmad County, Kohgiluyeh and Boyer-Ahmad Province, Iran. At the 2006 census, its population was 179, in 31 families.

References 

Populated places in Boyer-Ahmad County